Summit Township is a township in Chautauqua County, Kansas, USA.  As of the 2000 census, its population was 106.

Geography
According to the USGS, it contains three cemeteries: Denick, Rogers and Spring Creek.

The streams of Pool Creek, Possum Creek, Rock Creek and Spring Creek run through this township.

References
 USGS Geographic Names Information System (GNIS)

External links
 US-Counties.com
 City-Data.com

Townships in Chautauqua County, Kansas
Townships in Kansas